N'Douffoukankro is a town in central Ivory Coast. It is a sub-prefecture of Bouaflé Department in Marahoué Region, Sassandra-Marahoué District.

N'Douffoukankro was a commune until March 2012, when it became one of 1126 communes nationwide that were abolished.

In 2014, the population of the sub-prefecture of N'Douffoukankro was 29,097.

Villages
The 8 villages of the sub-prefecture of N'Douffoukankro and their population in 2014 are:
 Akowébo (2 103)
 Attossè (3 627)
 Benou (1 784)
 Blé (3 727)
 Diacohou-Sud (5 323)
 Nangrekro (3 453)
 N'dénoukro (2 889)
 N'douffoukankro (6 191)

Notes

Sub-prefectures of Marahoué
Former communes of Ivory Coast